

Grammy

Hall of Fame
Singer Billie Holiday was posthumously inducted into the Grammy Hall of Fame, which is a special Grammy award established in 1973 to honor recordings that are at least 25 years old and that have "qualitative or historical significance."

Best Album Album
The Grammy Award for Best Historical Album has been presented since 1979.

Other honors

Tributes
1972, Diana Ross portrayed Holiday in the film Lady Sings the Blues, which is loosely based on the 1956 autobiography of the same name. The film earned Ross a nomination for the Academy Award for Best Actress.
Singer Miki Howard released the Holiday tribute album, Miki Sings Billie: A Tribute to Billie Holiday in 1993. Miki Howard also portrayed Lady Day in a club scene in the 1992 motion picture " Malcolm X " starring Denzel Washington.
Paula Jai Parker portrayed Holiday in a Season 7 episode of the TV series Touched by an Angel, entitled "God Bless the Child," the title derived from a song which Holiday had written and performed.
Jazz pianist Mal Waldron performed as Holiday's accompanist and released several tribute albums including:
 Left Alone (Bethlehem, 1959)
 Blues for Lady Day (Black Lion, 1972)
 Left Alone '86 with Jackie McLean (Paddle Wheel, 1986)
 No More Tears (For Lady Day) (Timeless, 1989)
Billie Hollidy, Croatian National Theatre in Split by A.Ostojić & Ksenia Prohaska (2006)
 Argentinean comic artists Carlos Sampayo and José Antonio Muñoz made a graphic novel on her life, titled Billie Holiday (Fantagraphics Books, 1991; Spanish edition: Ojo de Pez, Buenos Aires, 2007).
 Holiday is the primary character in the play and later the film Lady Day at Emerson's Bar and Grill; the role was originated by Reenie Upchurch in 1986 and was played by Audra McDonald on Broadway (she received a Tony Award for her performance) and in the film.

Honors
 1987, Billie Holiday was posthumously awarded the Grammy Lifetime Achievement Award.
 1993, R&B singer Miki Howard released an album dedicated to Holiday titled Miki Sings Billie.
 1994, the United States Postal Service introduced a Billie Holiday postage stamp.
 1999, Holiday ranked No. 6 on VH1's 100 Greatest Women in Rock n' Roll.
 2000, she was inducted into the Rock and Roll Hall of Fame.
 2011, she was inducted into the National Women's Hall of Fame.

Over the years, there have been many tributes to Billie Holiday, including "The Day Lady Died", a 1959 poem by Frank O'Hara, and Langston Hughes' poem "Song for Billie Holiday".
In 1970 Frank Sinatra recorded the song Lady Day as a tribute.
In 1988 the group U2 released "Angel of Harlem" in her honor.
"My Only Friend" by The Magnetic Fields is a tribute to Billie Holiday.
Arthur Phillips features Holiday's 1953 concert in New York in his novel The Song is You (2009).

References

Holliday, Billie
Awards